Actinopus itacolomi is a species of mygalomorph spider in the family Actinopodidae. It can be found in Brazil.

The specific name itacolomi refers to the Itacolomi River.

References 

itacolomi
Spiders of Brazil
Spiders described in 2020